Coleophora fuliginosa is a moth of the family Coleophoridae. It is found in Spain.

References

fuliginosa
Moths described in 1998
Moths of Europe